A list of films produced in Argentina in 1957:

External links and references
 Argentine films of 1957 at the Internet Movie Database

1957
Argentine
Films